Scott Fetgatter (born July 4, 1968) is a Choctaw American politician who has served in the Oklahoma House of Representatives from the 16th district since 2016.

References

1968 births
Living people
Republican Party members of the Oklahoma House of Representatives
Choctaw Nation of Oklahoma state legislators in Oklahoma
21st-century American politicians
20th-century Native Americans
21st-century Native American politicians